Chris Egan is a British composer, orchestrator, conductor and musical director who has worked extensively on film, television and theatre music, as well as live concerts.

Career

Film 
Egan worked on the scores for Fantastic Beasts and Where To Find Them, Ethel & Ernest, and Napoleon. He is also a score composer debut for the 2022 British Canadian France film Fireheart.

Television 
His work on music for television includes The Halcyon, Hooten And The Lady, Cilla, Man Down, Upstairs Downstairs, and Britannia High.

Theatre 
Egan has worked on musical direction and orchestration for a number of musical theatre productions. These include: The Bodyguard, Water Babies, End Of The Rainbow, The Pajama Game, I Can’t Sing, Dance ‘Til Dawn, Kiss Me Kate, Crazy For You, Witches Of Eastwick, Grease, and Footloose.

Concert 
For a number of years, Egan has been Elaine Paige's musical director for her concert performances. He also worked on her series for Sky Arts, The Elaine Paige Show. He has also been the musical director for Shirley Bassey and Lionel Richie.

Production music 
Egan has written and produced music for the production music house Audio Network.

References 

Year of birth missing (living people)
Living people
21st-century British composers
British film score composers
British male film score composers
21st-century British male musicians